Graeme Smith (born 3 October 1982) is a Scottish footballer who plays as a goalkeeper and is now a goalkeeper coach for Rangers B Team.

Career

Kilmarnock
Bellshill-born Smith joined Kilmarnock from their boys club in 2000. He was loaned to Queens Park in the 2001–02 season, making 24 appearances in total and then to Stenhousemuir the following season, where he started 34 matches. Smith finally made his Kilmarnock début on 7 March 2004, as a substitute during a 1–1 draw with Hearts.

Smith was an unused substitute in the 2007 Scottish League Cup Final, when Kilmarnock lost 5–1 to Hibernian. After spending most of his time with Killie as a reserve keeper, firstly to Gordon Marshall and then to Alan Combe, Smith refused the clubs offer of a new contract at the end of the 2006–07 season and subsequently left, having made 47 appearances in total for the Rugby Park side.

Rangers
Smith's move to Rangers was announced on 27 June 2007. He signed a three-year deal and arrived on a free transfer. He made his Rangers début on 23 January 2008 in a 6–0 Scottish Cup win over East Stirlingshire. Smith was an unused substitute in the 2008 UEFA Cup Final and the 2008 Scottish Cup Final. The latter Rangers won 3–2 to give Smith his first career honour. He left the club in 2009, having only made that one début appearance against East Stirlingshire in two seasons.

St Johnstone
Smith joined St Johnstone on 10 July 2009, after some impressive performances for the Saints, unfortunate finger injuries saw Smith lose his place in the starting XI to experienced Finnish international, Peter Enckelman.

St Mirren
Smith signed a one-year contract with St Mirren on 9 June 2011, following the departure of Paul Gallacher to Dunfermline Athletic. Once again injury struck prior to the start of the season and Smith could not oust Craig Samson as first choice.

Peterhead
Smith signed a short-term contract with Peterhead in November 2012 and was an influential part of the title winning squad of 2013–14. Smith's outstanding form resulted in a place in the PFA League Two Team of the Year. After five years with the club, Smith was released at the end of the 2016–17 season following the club's relegation to Scottish League Two.

Raith Rovers
Smith signed a short-term contract with Raith Rovers in August 2017 taking him through to January 2018. After spending the full season with the club, he was released in May 2018.

Career statistics

Honours
Rangers
 Scottish Cup: 2007–08
 UEFA Cup : Runner-up: 2007–08

Peterhead
 Scottish League Two Champions: 2013–14
 PFA League Two Team of the Year: 2013–14

References

External links

1982 births
Living people
Footballers from Bellshill
Scottish footballers
Association football goalkeepers
Kilmarnock F.C. players
Stenhousemuir F.C. players
Queen's Park F.C. players
Rangers F.C. players
St Johnstone F.C. players
St Mirren F.C. players
Raith Rovers F.C. players
Scottish Premier League players
Scottish Football League players
Peterhead F.C. players
Scottish Professional Football League players
Rangers F.C. non-playing staff